The 1935 North Dakota Agricultural Bison football team was an American football team that represented North Dakota Agricultural College (now known as North Dakota State University) in the North Central Conference (NCC) during the 1935 college football season.  In its eighth season under head coach Casey Finnegan, the team compiled a 7–1–1 record (3–0–1 against NCC opponents) and won the NCC championship.

Schedule

References

North Dakota Agricultural
North Dakota State Bison football seasons
North Central Conference football champion seasons
North Dakota Agricultural Bison football